, 117 officeholders in the United States were affiliated with the Green Party, the majority of them in California, several in Illinois, Connecticut, Maine, Massachusetts, Oregon, Pennsylvania and Wisconsin, with five or fewer in ten other states. These included one mayor and one deputy mayor, and fourteen county or city commissioners (or equivalent). The remainder were members of school boards, clerks, and other local administrative bodies and positions.

Several Green Party members have been elected to state-level office, though not always as affiliates of the party. John Eder was elected to the Maine House of Representatives, re-elected in 2004, but defeated in 2006. Audie Bock was elected to the California State Assembly in 1999, but switched her registration to Independent seven months later running as such in the 2000 election. Richard Carroll was elected to the Arkansas House of Representatives in 2008, but switched parties to become a Democrat five months after his election. Fred Smith was elected to the Arkansas House of Representatives in 2012, but re-registered as a Democrat in 2014. In 2010, former Green Party leader Ben Chipman was elected to the Maine House of Representatives as an unenrolled candidate, and was re-elected in 2012 and 2014.

Gayle McLaughlin was twice elected mayor of Richmond, California, defeating two Democrats in 2006, and reelected in 2010, and elected to City Council in 2014 after completing her second term as mayor. With a population of over 100,000 people, it was the largest US city with a Green mayor. Fairfax, California; Arcata, California; Sebastopol, California; and New Paltz, New York are the only towns in the United States to have had a Green Party majority in their town councils. Twin Ridges Elementary in Nevada County, California held the first Green Party majority school board in the United States.

No nominee of the Green Party has been elected to office in the federal government.

Office holding politicians

A

B

C

D

E

F

G

H

I

J

K

L

M

N

O

P

Q

R

S

T

U

V

W

X

Y

Z

See also 
 List of socialist members of the United States Congress

References 

 Green Party
Green Party of the United States